Turnoceras is a genus of Devonian cephalopods belonging to the oncocerid family Nothoceratidae. Its shell is broadly expanding and exogastrically curved such that the flattened dorsum is on longitudinally concave side. Aperture unconstricted with no hyponomic sinus for the water jet funnel. siphuncle along the outer, ventral, side, with radial, plate-like actinosiphonate deposits occupying the interior.

Conostichoceras is similar externally, but has a siphuncle with a trapezoidal aspect to its siphuncle segments. Perimecoceras has similar concave siphuncle segments but is tubular in form.

References

 Sweet, W.C. 1964; Nautiloidea -Oncocerida;  Treatise on Invertebrate Paleontology, Part K ; Geological Society of America and University of Kansas press; Teichert and Moore (eds). 
  Turnoceras-Paleodb
 Sepkoski Cephalopod Genera

Prehistoric nautiloid genera
Oncocerida